Fresh Memory is a spaced repetition flashcard application, similar to SuperMemo.

The study algorithm is based on the SM2 algorithm, created for SuperMemo in the late 1980s.

The presented cards may include text and images. The cards are stored in an XML-based format, called dictionary files. 

The cards may have multiple "sides", called fields. The user defines what fields and in which order are used in the cards. The application automatically generates cards for different directions, e.g. from English language to French and in reversed order.

The primary purpose of the application is to learn and repeat foreign words. But other areas can be studied as well, for example, country's capitals, flags, mathematical formulas, etc. The study material is stored as collections of flashcards. The application has two studying modes: classic random browsing of flashcards and Spaced repetition. 

Fresh Memory is released as a free open-source software under GPL 3 license with full functionality.

See also

Anki (software)
List of flashcard software

References

External links 
  
 SM2 Algorithm
 Fresh Memory algorithm used in Fresh Memory

Spaced repetition software
Educational software that uses Qt
Free educational software